Mahant Balaknath Yadav is an Indian politician and current Member of Parliament from Alwar Lok Sabha constituency in Rajasthan. He is Chancellor of the Baba Mast Nath University (BMU). He is also 8th chief/ Mahant of the Nath sect of Hinduism. On 29 July 2016, Mahant Chandnath declared Balaknath as his successor in a ceremony which was attended by Yogi Adityanath and Baba Ramdev.

Early life
He was born in a Hindu Yadav family to Subhash Yadav and Urmila Devi.
He was named Gurumukh by Baba Khetanath in his early age. He used to live in Matsyendra Maharaj Ashram from 1985-1991 (up to age of 6) after that he moved to a Math in village Nathawali Theri in Hanumangarh district with Mahant Chandnath.

Political career
He was nominated as Bharatiya Janata Party candidate for Lok Sabha from Alwar, Rajasthan and he won the elections in 2019 by defeating Bhanwar Jitendra Singh of Indian National Congress by the margin of 3 Lakh votes.

See also
 Mahant Shreyonath sixth chief/ Mahant of the Nath sect.
 Mahant Chandnath seventh chief/ Mahant of the Nath sect.

References

Living people
Indian Hindus
1984 births
India MPs 2019–present
Bharatiya Janata Party politicians from Rajasthan
People from Alwar
Lok Sabha members from Rajasthan